Roy Kirksey (September 18, 1947 – September 5, 1981) was an American football guard. He played for the New York Jets from 1971 to 1972 and for the Philadelphia Eagles from 1973 to 1974. He died on September 5, 1981, after his car went out of control and overturned in Greenville County, South Carolina.

References

1947 births
1981 deaths
American football guards
Maryland Eastern Shore Hawks football players
New York Jets players
Philadelphia Eagles players
Sportspeople from Greenville, South Carolina
Road incident deaths in South Carolina